Maurice Froomes "Moss" Christie (18 September 1901 – 19 December 1978) was an Australian freestyle swimmer of the 1920s who won a silver medal in the 4×200-metre freestyle relay at the 1924 Summer Olympics in Paris. His involvement in various national and state championship events continued for 2 decades from 1917 until 1937. During this time he won 13 National freestyle titles, 7 NSW freestyle championships whilst providing substantial contribution to the Drummoyne Amateur Swimming Club.

Combining with Boy Charlton, Ernest Henry and Frank Beaurepaire, the Australians trailed the Americans (featuring Johnny Weissmuller - later to star as Tarzan the Ape Man) home by almost nine seconds, in a race conducted in the River Seine.  Christie had a disappointing campaign in the individual events, being eliminated in the heats of the 100-metre and 1500-metre freestyle and being disqualified for a false start in his heat of the 400-metre freestyle.

See also 
 List of Olympic medalists in swimming (men)

References

Sources
 

1901 births
1978 deaths
Olympic silver medalists for Australia
Olympic swimmers of Australia
Swimmers at the 1924 Summer Olympics
Australian male freestyle swimmers
Medalists at the 1924 Summer Olympics
Olympic silver medalists in swimming
20th-century Australian people